Pampanga is a province in the Central Luzon region of the Philippines.

Pampanga may also refer to:
 Pampanga Eye, a Ferris wheel in the Philippines
 Pampanga Hotel, a heritage house in the Philippines
 Pampanga River, in the Central Luzon region of the Philippines

See also
 Pampangan language